The 2010 Seattle Sounders FC season was the club's second season in Major League Soccer, the top tier of professional soccer in the United States. It was the 30th season played by a team bearing the Sounders name.

The Sounders opened the regular season with a 2–0 victory over expansion side Philadelphia Union on March 25, 2010, at Qwest Field in Seattle. They closed out the regular season on October 23, 2010, with a 1–2 loss to the Houston Dynamo. Seattle qualified for the playoffs but lost to the Los Angeles Galaxy in the Western Conference Semifinals.

In addition to MLS play, the Sounders defended their U.S. Open Cup title by defeating the Columbus Crew in the final played at Qwest Field. Seattle also participated in their first CONCACAF Champions League as a MLS club and defeated El Salvadorian club Isidro Metapán in the preliminary round to qualify for the group stage. The Sounders lost all but one of their group stage matches and finished at the bottom of Group C.

Background 

The 2010 season is the second season for Seattle Sounders FC who began play in 2009 as the league's 15th team.  Seattle is the defending champion of the U.S. Open Cup.  In their inaugural season, Sounders FC became the second MLS expansion team in league history (Chicago was first) to win the U.S. Open Cup tournament in their first season.  They did so by defeating D.C. United 2–1 on the road at RFK Stadium.  In winning the U.S. Open Cup tournament, Sounders FC qualified for the preliminary round of the 2010–11 CONCACAF Champions League.

In 2009 Sounders FC became the second MLS expansion team in league history (Chicago again was first) to qualify for the playoffs in their first season.  Seattle finished the regular season with a record of 12 wins, 7 losses, and 11 ties and set an all-time MLS record for average attendance of 30,943 fans per game.  Sounders FC's inaugural season came to an end in the 2009 MLS Cup Playoffs when they lost in the conference semifinals to the Houston Dynamo with a 1–0 aggregate score in a two-legged series.  During the 2009 season, all 15 Sounders FC MLS regular season home matches, their home playoff match, and their 4 home U.S. Open Cup matches (played at Starfire Sports Complex) were sold out.

Review

Preseason 
On November 25, 2009, Sebastian Le Toux was drafted away from Seattle by the Philadelphia Union as part of the 2009 MLS Expansion Draft, and waived midfielder Michael Fucito and defenders Evan Brown and Lamar Neagle.  Le Toux had been acquired the previous year as Sounders FC's first ever signing.

Seattle's preseason was broken up into two stages.  The team went to Arizona for preseason fitness and then to Murcia in Spain for the La Manga Cup, a preseason tournament.

In the 2010 MLS SuperDraft the Sounders chose UCLA forward David Estrada in the first round, Villanova midfielder/forward Mike Seamon in the second round, and San Diego State midfielder Jamel Wallace.  On March 4, the club announced the signing of Swiss International striker Blaise Nkufo. He will be joining the club after the FC Twente season is over and the 2010 FIFA World Cup.  On March 11, the inaugural Seattle Sounders FC Community Shield preseason match was played against the Portland Timbers continuing the Portland-Seattle rivalry.  Seattle lost to Portland 1–0 in front of 18,606 supporters while rain poured down.

March 

Seattle was chosen for the second consecutive season to host MLS First Kick, the first match of the MLS season, which was held on Thursday, March 25 and nationally televised on ESPN2.  Joe Roth, Sounders FC Majority Owner stated, "Being selected to participate in the first match of the season is a testament to the passion and energy of our fans."  Their opponent was the expansion franchise Philadelphia Union, the league's 16th team as they played in their inaugural match. Seattle won the match 2–0 with goals scored by Brad Evans in the 12th minute and Freddy Montero in the 43rd minute.  The attendance of 36,241 set a team record for an MLS regular-season or postseason game.

April 

On April 2, Sounders FC hosted the New York Red Bulls for their second league match.  New York prevailed 1–0 with Macoumba Kandji scoring the lone goal off a corner kick.  Seattle had several scoring chances later including a club record 12 corner kicks, but was unable to equalize.

On April 9, Seattle played their first road match of the season, facing the defending MLS Cup champion, Real Salt Lake, in Sandy, Utah.  Sounders FC scored twice in the match, first on a Steve Zakuani counter-attack goal in the 11th minute and then again in the 73rd minute when Tyrone Marshall headed in a free kick from Freddie Ljungberg.  Salt Lake was able to answer each with a goal of their own, the latter coming in the final moments of extra time.  The match ended in a 2–2 draw.

The following week, on April 17, Seattle returned home to face the undefeated Kansas City Wizards.  The game appeared to be ending a scoreless tie until late substitute Michael Fucito scored his first career goal in 92nd minute of the match off a throw in from Brad Evans.  Sounders FC defeated Kansas City 1–0.  The following week, Seattle had two road games in a 4-day period.  First they traveled to Frisco, Texas to face FC Dallas on April 22.  Steve Zakuani and Fredy Montero scored for Sounders FC while Jeff Cunningham scored two penalty kicks for Dallas, the second of which coming in extra time on a questionable call.  The Dallas game ended in a 2–2 tie. During the second leg of the road trip on April 25, Sounders FC was defeated 2–0 by Toronto FC at BMO Field. Seattle conceded their first ever goal to Toronto when Dwayne De Rosario scored in the 58th minute. He later assisted O'Brian White on a second goal in the 76th minute.

May 
Sounders FC began May with a tie at home against the Columbus Crew.  Steve Zakuani scored an early breakaway goal in the 8th minute to take the lead.  However, Seattle's stoppage time problems continued as the Crew's Steven Lenhart scored off a header in the first minute of stoppage time before the half.  The game ended 1–1.

The following week, on May 8, Sounders FC hosted the Los Angeles Galaxy.  Seattle's continued inability to score and their recent trend of defensive breakdowns culminated in an embarrassing 4–0 loss to the Galaxy.  This was Seattle's worst ever defeat at home and it was played in front of a team record attendance for a regular season match of 36,273 fans.  Sounders FC newcomer Miguel Montaño made his debut with the club in the defeat to the Galaxy.  The day after the lopsided defeat to Los Angeles, Sounders FC owner Adrian Hanauer announced a refund for all 32,000 season ticket holders for the embarrassment and indicated that changes were in the works for the club.

Sounders FC regrouped from the difficult loss to LA the next week when they visited the New York Red Bulls.  Fredy Montero's absence from the starting lineup was a surprising change in the match.  Montero, however, was subbed on late in the game and provided the winning goal in the 85th minute for a 1–0 victory. During the first game of the 2010 Heritage Cup on May 22, the team lost 1–0 to the San Jose Earthquakes at Qwest. Chris Wondolowski scored 11 minutes in the match, lengthening the "scoring drought" for the Sounders FC at home.

Three days later, May 26, the team participated in their first friendly match of the season, winning it 3–0 in a shutout against Boca Juniors.  Roger Levesque, Pat Noonan and Mike Seamon each scored goals, the latter in his debut for the team. The team ended the month with another 1–0 loss on May 29, this one against the Colorado Rapids, on the road; Conor Casey scored the only goal of the match.

June 

The Sounders FC began June with a 3–0 win against the New England Revolution at home, ending the scoreless pattern. Leo González scored in the fifth minute and started a 3-goal streak. Steve Zakuani volleyed in another goal in the 24th minute off of a kick by Brad Evans. The final goal of the match was scored by Fredy Montero in the 42nd minute, while the second half was more defensive. During the final MLS match before the World Cup break, D.C. United defeated the team 3–2 in a nationally televised game. Chris Pontius scored all three of D.C.'s goals, two in the  first half and one in the second. In the 90th minute, James Riley scored a goal and was accompanied by Montero's goal one minute later.

After the World Cup break, the Sounders FC went to play the Philadelphia Union at the new PPL Park in front of a crowd of 18,755 during a humid day. Pat Noonan scored the first ever goal at the stadium shortly before halftime, putting the team ahead 1–0. Former Sounders FC player Sebastian Le Toux scored the equalizer on a penalty kick in the 55th minute and later assisted in the two following goals in the 79th and 84th minutes, making the team lose 3–1 to the Union.

The Sounders FC began their U.S. Open Cup defense in a rematch against rivals to the south Portland Timbers at a sold-out PGE Park. Nate Jaqua scored in the 13th minute, but Portland's Bright Dike scored the equalizer in the 37th minute. The game was tied 1–1 and went into the franchise's first penalty shootout. Defender Zach Scott scored the final penalty to give the team a 4–3 win on penalties.

July 

The Sounders FC went down to Carson, California on July 4 to play the Los Angeles Galaxy, who they previously lost to 4–0 at home in May. The game was also the first game for Landon Donovan and Edson Buddle since the World Cup. LA took an early lead, with Buddle scoring off a corner by Donovan in the 18th minute, followed by a goal by Juninho in the 48th minute. Steve Zakuani scored the team's only goal of the match, in the 66th minute, before an own goal by James Riley in the 78th minute.

After the loss to LA, both teams traveled to the Starfire Sports Complex for a rematch, in the U.S. Open Cup. The game was scoreless until Nate Jaqua scored in the 50th minute, repeating in the 62nd minute. The game ended in a 2–0 victory for the Sounders FC, ensuring a semifinal spot against Chivas USA. The following Sunday, the team played their first post-World Cup home game against FC Dallas, drawing 1–1 in front of a crowd of 36,091. Montero headed in the ball in the 14th minute to lead 1–0. In the 56th minute, Miguel Montaño, playing in his first MLS start, was sent off the field and the Sounders FC played a man down for the rest of the match, eventually conceding a goal by David Ferreira in the 87th minute.

Following the tie to FC Dallas, the team traveled east to play D.C. United, who they previously lost to 3–2 at home in June. The game remained scoreless until the 89th minute, when Roger Levesque headed in the game winner, winning 1–0 and ending a 4-game MLS winless streak. During the second and final friendly of the season, the Sounders FC suffered a 2–1 loss to Celtic F.C. in front of a crowd of 45,631 at home. In the 30th minute, goalkeeper Terry Boss was sent off after tripping Georgios Samaras and Fredy Montero was taken out of the game to make way for the debut of third goalkeeper Jordan Jennings. Samaras converted a penalty kick and was joined by a goal by Paddy McCourt for a 2–0 lead for Celtic. David Estrada attempted to tie it up in the 64th minute, but the game ended at 2–1.

The team returned to action on July 25 at home against the Colorado Rapids in a game nationally televised on Fox Soccer Channel.  Steve Zakuani got the Sounders on the board in the eighth minute, but Colorado's Omar Cummings answered thirty seconds later, technically in the ninth.  Zakuani converted an opportunity in the 18th minute.  The game ended 2–1, before the second-largest crowd of the season, 36,333. The Sounders continued their winning streak at home with a 1–0 victory against Isidro Metapán in the CONCACAF Champions League preliminary round. Seven yellow cards were given, four of which to the team, and the game was scoreless at halftime. Substitute Fredy Montero shot from 35 yards out in the 60th minute and the ball bounced into the net.

Uruguay midfielder Álvaro Fernández was signed on July 29, meanwhile Freddie Ljungberg was traded to the Chicago Fire on July 30. After Fernández addition the trade of Ljungberg, the team won 1–0 in San Jose by a header in the 26th minute by Fredy Montero.

August 

The Sounders began August at Estadio Cuscatlán in San Salvador, El Salvador against Isidro Metapán for the second match of a two-legged series for the preliminary round of the CONCACAF Champions League, which they led 1–0 on aggregate. Anel Canales of Metapán scored in the 17th minute and Metapán led 1–0 at halftime. Newly signed midfielder Álvaro Fernández headed a pass from James Riley in the 74th minute, which equalized the score and let the team advance 2–1 on aggregate.

After the win over Metapán, the team returned home to a 2–0 win over the Houston Dynamo. The match remained scoreless at halftime, meanwhile two Sounders were given yellow cards: Sanna Nyassi and James Riley. Blaise Nkufo was also given a yellow card minutes into the second half and two Houston players also received them. In the 64th minute, Fredy Montero received a goal kick from Kasey Keller and scored, giving the team a 1–0 lead. Álvaro Fernández made the lead 2–0 shortly after subbing on in the 88th minute.

The following Saturday, the Sounders traveled to the Home Depot Center to play against Chivas USA. The game ended in a 0–0 draw, with Jeff Parke earning his first yellow card of the season in the 89th minute and Leo González was sent off, along with Mariano Trujillo of Chivas in the 91st minute after aggressive play.

On August 28, Freddie Ljungberg returned to Qwest Field as a member of the visiting Chicago Fire. While Ljungberg was applauded before and after the game, the crowd jeered each time he touched the ball. In a rough first half that included 19 combined fouls and three yellow cards, Chicago struck first when Jeff Parke was deemed to have handled the ball in his own penalty area. John Thorrington converted the penalty in the 28th minute. Seattle responded soon thereafter with Fredy Montero scoring in the 36th minute with a far post strike to beat Sean Johnson. The teams stayed level through the second half and into stoppage time. In the 92nd minute, however, James Riley took a quick throw in on the right side to Nathan Sturgis who found Montero open on the far post. Montero headed the ball down and past the Chicago goalkeeper for the game-winner making the final scoreline 2–1.

September 

September would see Seattle playing matches in three competitions, six matches away from Seattle, and eight matches total. Continuing their U.S. Open Cup defense, Seattle took on Chivas USA at the Starfire Sports Complex on September 1. In front of a crowd of 4,547, the Sounders secured a 3–1 victory and their place in the 2010 U.S. Open Cup final.

On September 4, the Sounders traveled to Gillette Stadium to face the New England Revolution. Following an altercation between Patrick Ianni and Shalrie Joseph, New England scored three goals in 11 minutes to win the match by a score of 3–1

Returning to Qwest Field, the Sounders played to a 0–0 draw with Real Salt Lake on September 9.

Sounders owners chartered an airplane to take the team to Estadio Ricardo Saprissa Aymá in San José, Costa Rica to face C.D. Saprissa in Champions League play on September 14. Leo Gonzalez was sent off in the 38th minute and the home side capitalized on the man advantage to win the match 2–0

The team flew directly from San José to face the Columbus Crew on September 18. Striker Blaise Nkufo scored his first goal as a Sounder and added two more to record a hat trick. Nathan Sturgis converted a penalty kick after Sanna Nassi was fouled in the penalty area to make the final score 0–4.

Again chartering a plane for the Champions League campaign, on September 22 Seattle flew to Monterrey, Mexico to face C.F. Monterrey of the Mexican Primera División at Estadio Tecnológico. With an own goal from Monterrey midfielder Hiram Ricardo Mier and a goal from Michael Fucito just before halftime, Seattle had a 0–2 lead going into the second half and it looked that Seattle might become the first MLS team to win a match in Mexico. Seattle could not maintain the lead though, and gave up three goals in a span of four minutes. Monterrey won the match 3–2

Continuing their travels, the Sounders again flew directly to their next destination. This time, to face the Chicago Fire, they flew directly to Toyota Park in Bridgeview, Illinois on September 25. Kasey Keller was tested repeatedly but kept a clean sheet and Blase Nkufo scored in the 88th minute to give the Sounders the 0–1 win.

In their final match of the month, on September 29, Sounders FC returned home face C.D. Marathón in Champions League play.  The Sounders recorded their first points in group play as Michael Fucito scored goals in the 21st and 68th minutes. Even though the Sounders earned three points, they were eliminated from the competition due to the 2–2 draw between Monterrey and Saprissa.

October 

The month of October started off with the Sounders needing only two wins to qualify for the playoffs. They would need to win against incoming Toronto FC, whom were looking for one of the final seeds in the playoffs, and then travel out to Kansas City to take on the Wizards, another team longing for postseason action.

On October 2, a 3-2 victory over the Reds gave Rave Green one win closer to post-season action. Seattle would then travel out to Kansas City and nab a 2-1 victory, securing the Sounders playoff action. Goals from Gambian international Sanna Nyassi and Uruguayan international, Álvaro Fernández led the Sounders over the Wizards.

From there, the Sounders would take a comfortable 2-1 victory over Chivas USA before losing their season finale in Houston 1-2.

Finishing 6th overall, Seattle won the fourth-seed in the Western Conference championship in the MLS Cup playoffs going against Supporters' Shield-winners, Los Angeles Galaxy. The Sounders hosted the first game in front of a crowd of 35,000; the highest ever for a quarterfinal match in MLS playoff history. The records were hindered, thanks to a 38th-minute goal from Golden Boot-runner up, Edson Buddle; who scored a volley from a third of the pitch out that caught Kasey Keller off-guard. The Sounders would then head into Los Angeles down a goal in the aggregate series.

November 

On November 7, the Sounders traveled out to Los Angeles to take on the Galaxy. Down 1-0, the Sounders were hoping to salvage this by rallying to overcome the deficit. It seemingly faded off thanks to a pair of early first half goals from the Galaxy's Omar Gonzalez and Edson Buddle, giving the Galaxy a 3-0 aggregate lead over the Sounders.

Throughout most of the game the Sounders continuously pressed the Galaxy hoping to pull close to their lead. Steve Zakuani managed to score a late 85th-minute goal, but it was too little too late as the Galaxy would defeat the Sounders 3-1 on aggregate.

Match results

Preseason

La Manga Cup

Seattle Sounders FC Community Shield

MLS regular season

MLS Playoffs

U.S. Open Cup

CONCACAF Champions League

Preliminary round 

Seattle earned a preliminary round spot in the 2010–11 edition of the CONCACAF Champions League by winning the 2009 U.S. Open Cup over D.C. United. It was the first time in club's history or in any previous Seattle Sounders franchise, that they entered an international competition such as the Champions League. The draw for the preliminary round took place on May 19, 2010, at the CONCACAF headquarters in New York City. Seattle was paired against Isidro Metapán, a Salvadorian club that won the 2010 Salvadorian Clausura.

The two sides met in Seattle on July 28, 2010. The Sounders set another attendance record of 17,688; which became the highest crowd to watch a preliminary round draw in the Champions League, the number also remained the highest crowd an MLS-side drew for Champions League play for a month. There, a 60th-minute goal from Freddy Montero gave the Sounders a 1-0 win and a goal advantage on aggregate going down to Metapán, El Salvador. The second leg of Champions League action saw the Sounders go down 1-0 to Metapán in the match, and level on aggregate, due to an 18th-minute opener from retired Panamanian international Anel Canales. Recently acquired Álvaro Fernández tied the game in the 74th minute, to level the match at one, and to give the Sounders a 2-1 lead on aggregate. Ultimately, the Sounders would win the match and secure a group stage spot in Champions League play.

Series Results

Group stage 

Along with Honduras's Marathón, Seattle was placed into Group C along with 2009 Mexico Apertura champions, Monterrey and 2010 Costa Rican Verano champions Saprissa. On August 19, 2010, the Sounders opened up Group Stage against Marathón at Estadio Rosenthal in San Pedro Sula. There, the Sounders opened up the score sheet with a 17th-minute goal from Roger Levesque. In spite of the early goal, the Sounders could not hold the lead and relinquished it late in the first half, when Marathón's Orvin Paz leveled the game ten minutes later. In first-half injury time, Marathón took the lead with a converted penalty kick from Nicolas Cardozo. The goal ultimately led to the 2-1 victory for the Verdolagas.

Chances to earn a quarterfinal berth became slim for the Sounders as they dropped their next two consecutive games, a 2-0 loss at home to Monterrey and an away loss to Saprissa by the same margin. With an 0-3-0 record, the Sounders stood in last place in their group and had the weakest record of all group stage clubs in the Champions League. Needing a win to keep their knockout stage hopes alive, the Sounders would have to travel south to Estadio Tecnológico in Mexico to take on red-hot Monterrey. After Real Salt Lake lost at Cruz Azul 5-4, and Columbus Crew lost 1-0 at Santos Laguna, the Sounders were the last hope for an American team to have a win in Mexico in a meaningful competition. For a while, it seemed like they would accomplish the feat. An own goal from Monterrey's Sergio Pérez gave the Sounders an unlikely lead over the Rayados. The Sounders built upon that lead when Michael Fucito doubled it in the 44th minute, giving the Sounders 2-0 advantage at halftime. However, a pair of quick goals from Mexican international Aldo de Nigris and Chilean-international Humberto Suazo leveled the game at two apiece. Perez avenged his own goal minutes following the stalemate with a converted penalty kick in the 75th minute of play. The game ended in a 3-2 defeat, which ultimately led to the Sounders FC being eliminated from quarterfinal contention. The win gave Monterrey a guaranteed first-place finish in Group C.

As a result of being knocked out the championship round in the Champions League, the Sounders began to emphasize more on the U.S. Open Cup final against Columbus and their push for the playoffs. Because of this, the Sounders fielded a primarily second-tier squad in their final two games, both at home against Marathón and Saprissa, respectively. Fucito, who scored against Monterrey on September 22, scored both of Seattle's goals in their 2-0 triumph over visiting Marathon. Seattle would conclude their Champions League campaign by hosting Saprissa on October 19. Nate Jaqua opened the scoring for the Sounders, but just as they opened Group Stage, they would relinquish their lead, falling 2-1 to Saprissa.

Match results

Results summary

Friendlies

League table 

Conference

Overall

Results summary

Squad 

As of February 23, 2010.

 (Injured Reserve)

 (Injured Reserve)

 (Injured Reserve)

Transfers

In

Out 

 Player joined his new club on July 15, 2010.

Coaching staff
As of April 24, 2010.

Statistics

Appearances and goals

Last updated on 25 August 2016.

|-
|colspan="14"|Players who left the club during the season:

Recognition 
MLS Save of the Year

MLS Player of the Month

MLS Player of the Week

MLS Goal of the Week

NAPA Save of the Week

MLS W.O.R.K.S. Humanitarian of the Month

References

Seattle Sounders FC seasons
Seattle Sounders FC
Seattle Sounders FC
Seattle Sounders FC
U.S. Open Cup champion seasons